Enchant is a free software project developed as part of the AbiWord word processor with the aim of unifying access to the various existing spell-checker software. Enchant wraps a common set of functionality present in a variety of existing products/libraries, and exposes a stable API/ABI for doing so. Where a library doesn't implement some specific functionality, Enchant will emulate it.

Enchant is capable of having multiple backends loaded at once. As of January 2021 it has support for 7 backends:
 Hunspell (spell checker used by LibreOffice, Firefox and Google Chrome)
 Nuspell (modern spell checker compatible with Hunspell dictionaries)
 Aspell (intends to replace Ispell)
 Hspell (Hebrew)
 Voikko (Finnish)
 Zemberek (Turkish)
 AppleSpell (macOS)

GNOME LaTeX and gedit rely on the gspell library, which uses Enchant.

Enchant is currently licensed under GNU Lesser General Public License (LGPL), with an additional permission notice saying that any plugin backend can be loaded and used by Enchant. This ensures that it can use the native spell checkers on various platforms (Mac OS X, Microsoft Office, Amazon Kindle, etc.), and users can use their favorite third-party product to do the job.

References

External links 

 Project homepage
 PyEnchant - Python bindings for Enchant

Free spelling checking programs
Language software for Linux
Language software for macOS
Language software for Windows